The bombing of Wukro was a mass extrajudicial killing that took place in Wukro in the Tigray Region of Ethiopia during the Tigray War, on 16 November 2020. Wukro is a mid-sized town, capital of woreda Kilte Awulaelo, Eastern zone of Tigray.

Massacre
Ahead of the Ethiopian National Defense Force and Eritrean Defence Forces arrival in late November 2020, heavy bombing levelled homes and businesses in Wukro (Eastern Tigray) and sent plumes of dust and smoke rising above near-deserted streets on 16 and 25-27 November 2020. People were hiding in their houses and 14 civilians  were killed in the bombing that involved the intervention of the Ethiopian Airforce and "Pterosaurus" drones, launched by the United Arab Emirates from its base in Assab in Eritrea. The Chinese-made, armed drones bombed Tigrayan towns and defence forces. EEPA has provided a summarised translation of the Chinese article.

Perpetrators
Analysts interpreted the identity of the perpetrators of drone attacks as United Arab Emirates, and locals identified airplanes that carried out the bombings as belonging to the Ethiopian Airforce.

Victims
The “Tigray: Atlas of the humanitarian situation” mentions 14 victims. Many victims have been identified, but, as Wukro has been affected by every phase of the Tigray war, often the specific event in which victims died is not known yet.

Reactions
The series of massacres in Wukro received international attention in media articles. The “Tigray: Atlas of the humanitarian situation”, that documented this massacre received international media attention, particularly with regard its Annex A, that lists the massacres.

References

External links
World Peace Foundation: Starving Tigray

Massacres in 2020
2020 airstrikes
Airstrikes during the Tigray War
Massacres committed by Eritrea
2020 massacres of the Tigray War